The Swedish Economic Crime Authority (abbreviated EBM or SECA) is a  Swedish government agency organized under the Ministry of Justice, with the mandate to investigate and prosecute financial crimes, like dishonesty to creditors, bookkeeping crime, financial market abuse, money laundering, tax fraud and EU fraud. SECA is also tasked to monitor and analyse economic crime trends, initiate joint action between authorities and propose legislative changes designed curb economic crime. SECA primarily focusses on serious economic crime, with a special emphasis on investigating crime in the financial market and recovering the proceeds of crime.

History
SECA was set up in 1998, to safeguard the expertise of experienced police officers and prosecutors, who often got assigned to other types of investigative work, not related to economic crime. The authority was the first in Sweden to co-house police officers and prosecutors under the same roof.

Organizational structure
SECA has national jurisdiction and operates nationally, with a headquarters in Stockholm and approximately 560 employees. There are about 100 prosecutors and 230 police officers as well as different specialists such as analysts, forensic accountants and administrative staff. SECA is led by Director-General Monica Rodrigo. SECA's operational units consist of 11 local public prosecution offices that investigate and prosecute financial crimes and five operational police units with specialist functions such as surveillance teams and criminal intelligence units.

See also

Crime in Sweden

References

External links

Swedish Economic Crime Authority - Official website (English)

Law enforcement agencies of Sweden
Financial crime prevention